The Mixed synchronized 10 metre platform competition at the 2017 World Championships was held on 15 July 2017.

Results
The final was started at 13:00.

References

Mixed synchronized 10 metre platform
World Aquatics Championships